WAKV (980 AM) is a radio station broadcasting a classic country format. Licensed to Otsego, Michigan, it first began broadcasting in 1958 with the WDMC call sign.

In February 2021, WAKV changed their format from adult standards/oldies to classic country, branded as "98.9 Jethro FM".

Previous logo

References
Michiguide.com - WAKV History

External links

AKV
Classic country radio stations in the United States
Radio stations established in 1960